Stanisław Adam Sośnicki (12 September 1896 – 2 July 1962) was a Polish military officer, diplomat, sprinter and long jumper. He competed in the men's 100 metres and the long jump events at the 1924 Summer Olympics.

Sośnicki fought in the September Campaign of World War II, defending Poland and the capital city of Warsaw.

References

External links
 

1896 births
1962 deaths
Athletes (track and field) at the 1924 Summer Olympics
Polish diplomats
Polish male sprinters
Polish male long jumpers
Olympic athletes of Poland
Athletes from Warsaw
People from Warsaw Governorate
Polish military personnel of World War II
Ambassadors of Poland to Turkey
20th-century Polish people